"Rain" is a song by British rapper, singer, songwriter, and record producer AJ Tracey and British rapper Aitch, featuring production credits from Tay Keith. The song was released on 6 March 2020 peaked at number 3 on the UK Singles Chart. The song was nominated for the Brit Award for Song of the Year at the 2021 ceremony.

Music video
The music video was filmed in Los Angeles and was shot by acclaimed director Arrad.

Release
The song was premiered on BBC Radio 1 as Annie Mac's 'Hottest Record in the World' and on BBC 1Xtra as DJ Target's 'Target Embargo'. AJ Tracey also dropped the hook for the song on the social platform Triller prior to the radio premiere.

Chart performance
"Rain" reached number 3 on its first week of release, becoming the highest new entry behind "Blinding Lights" by The Weeknd and "Roses" by Saint Jhn. It also topped the Official UK Trending Chart on its release week, reflecting the songs that were popular online, on the radio and other media. The song went on to spend 3 weeks in the top ten and a total of 14 weeks in the top 40.

Charts

Weekly charts

Year-end charts

Certifications

References

2020 singles
2020 songs
Aitch (rapper) songs
AJ Tracey songs
Songs written by AJ Tracey